Acontias kgalagadi, the Kalahari burrowing skink or Kgalagadi legless skink, is a species of lizard in the family Scincidae. It is found in Namibia, Botswana, South Africa, and Angola.

References

Acontias
Skinks of Africa
Reptiles of Angola
Reptiles of Botswana
Reptiles of Namibia
Reptiles of South Africa
Reptiles described in 2010
Taxa named by Aaron M. Bauer